The Trouble with... Harry was the debut album by British musician Harry (aka Dirty Harry). It was released on 21 April 2003 but failed to reach the UK album top 75.

The album encountered numerous delays during its recording and production and, following a lawsuit with Clint Eastwood over copyright issues with the name 'Dirty Harry', it had to be re-recorded.

The album contains 13 tracks, including the singles "So Real" and "Follow Me" as well as two older singles recorded under the name Dirty Harry, "Eye" and "Nothing Really Matters". "Push It (Real Good)", a sampling of the Salt-N-Pepa song "Push It" and a cover of Belouis Some's "Imagination" which appeared on Harry's "Under the Covers" EP were also included on the album.

Track listing 

A remixed and remastered 20th Anniversary Edition was released in December 2021, with a number of tracks from the original removed and replaced by remixes and B-sides.

Critical response 
The album received generally positive reviews. The Guardian described the album as a "not-unappealing blend of suspenders, silliness and Siouxsie Sioux", giving it 3 out of a possible 5. Kerrang! magazine gave it 4 out of 5, saying "If you give your heart to a rock goddess this year, let it be Harry."

 "An icon-in-waiting" – The Guardian
 "She rocks hard" – The Independent On Sunday
 "Platinum Rock-goddess-in-waiting" – Kerrang! with KKKK (4 star) Review
 "The no-cock revolution just found its new ringleader" – NME
 "A remarkable debut" – The Fly

References 

2003 debut albums
Dirty Harry (musician) albums